Vernonia schweinfurthii is a species of plant in the family Asteraceae. It is native to Angola, Burundi, Cameroon, Central African Repu, Ivory Coast, Malawi, Nigeria, Rwanda, Sudan, Zambia. One subspecies is recognized: Vernonia schweinfurthii var. bukamaensis.

The herb grows from 6 to 30 centimeter with a tall woody rootstock. Its leaves are linear and elliptic to oblong elliptic, and sizes from 05 to 0.8 centimeters. Its corolla are mauve or purple and stretches from 5 to 11 mm.

References 

schweinfurthii
Flora of Angola
Flora of Burundi
Flora of Cameroon
Flora of the Central African Republic
Flora of Ivory Coast
Flora of Malawi
Flora of Nigeria
Flora of Rwanda
Flora of Sudan
Flora of Zambia